The Truth (simplified Chinese: 谜图) is a Singaporean Chinese modern suspense drama which was telecasted on Singapore's free-to-air channel, MediaCorp Channel 8. It made its debut on 7 April 2008 and ended on 2 May 2008. This drama serial consists of 20 episodes, and was screened on every weekday night at 9:00 pm.

Cast

Main cast
 Tay Ping Hui as Lu Zhiwei
 Joanne Peh as Chen Shuxian
 Shaun Chen as Alex Su
 Rebecca Lim as Chen Shufen
 Zhu Houren as Su Zhenyuan
 Richard Low as Lu Rongguang
 Zhu Yuye as Susan Ong

Synopsis
The series main focus is a treasure map that was inherited by Su Zhenyuan from his late father. That same map is also coveted by Lu Rongguang, who was Zhenyuan's business partner.

Meanwhile, Chen Shuxian and Chen Shufen came to Singapore for career opportunities, but their mother, who came with the sisters, was murdered shortly after arrival. Through the subsequent investigation, Shuxian got to know police officer Lu Zhiwei, and Shufen began an intimate relationship with Zhenyuan's son, Alex Su.

Shuxian, meanwhile, discovered that her mother's death may be linked to Zhenyuan, and later became embroiled on Rongguang's plot to get the treasure map.

External links
 Official Website

Singapore Chinese dramas
2008 Singaporean television series debuts
2008 Singaporean television series endings
Channel 8 (Singapore) original programming